Peter Barth Farm, on Lower Tug Fork Rd. near Alexandria, Kentucky, is a historic farm  established in the early to mid-nineteenth century. The farm complex includes a log home, stone smokehouse, and stone storage building. Also known as the Thomer Farm, It was listed on the National Register of Historic Places in 1983 as part of the German Settlement, Four Mile Creek Area TR.

History 
Peter Barth was originally from Wallertheim, Germany. In 1857, he purchased 77 acres of land in the Tug Fork area from Charles Zennick. Barth was the son of Jacob Barth, who settled in the Tug Fork area in 1842 as one of the first German settlers in the region. The Peter Barth Farm is part of a significant German settlement in southern Campbell County, Kentucky, in the Four Mile Creek Area.

References 

National Register of Historic Places in Campbell County, Kentucky
Farms on the National Register of Historic Places in Kentucky
German-American culture in Kentucky
Log buildings and structures on the National Register of Historic Places in Kentucky